Gilboy is a surname. Notable people with the surname include:

 Bertram Gilboy (1894–1974), English footballer
 W. J. Gilboy (1876–?), American schoolteacher and politician